The Billabong Pro Teahupoo 2016 was an event of the Association of Surfing Professionals for 2016 World Surf League.

This event was held from 19 to 30  August at Teahupo'o, (Tahiti, French Polynesia) and opposed by 36 surfers.

The tournament was won by Kelly Slater (USA), who beat John Florence (HAW) in final.

Round 1

Round 2

Round 3

Round 4

Round 5

Quarter finals

Semi finals

Final

References

Tahiti Pro
2016 in French Polynesian sport
2016 World Surf League